Abdul Rehman Khan Kanju (born 18 July 1976) is a Pakistani politician who has been a member of the National Assembly of Pakistan since August 2018. Previously, he was a member of the National Assembly from June 2013 to May 2018.

He served as Minister of State for Overseas Pakistanis and Human Resource Development, in Abbasi cabinet from August 2017 to May 2018.

Early life
He was born on 18 July 1976.

Political career

He was elected to the National Assembly of Pakistan as an independent candidate from Constituency NA-155 (Lodhran-II) in 2013 Pakistani general election. He received 85,452 votes and defeated Muhammad Akhtar Khan Kanju. He joined Pakistan Muslim League (N) (PML-N) in May 2013.

Following the election of Shahid Khaqan Abbasi as Prime Minister of Pakistan in August 2017, he was inducted into the federal cabinet of Abbasi. He was appointed as the Minister of State for Overseas Pakistanis and Human Resource Development. Upon the dissolution of the National Assembly on the expiration of its term on 31 May 2018, Kanju ceased to hold the office as Minister of State for Overseas Pakistanis and Human Resource Development.

He was re-elected to the National Assembly as a candidate of PML-N from Constituency NA-160 (Lodhran-I) in 2018 Pakistani general election.

References

Living people
Pakistan Muslim League (N) politicians
Punjabi people
Pakistani MNAs 2013–2018
1976 births
Place of birth missing (living people)
Pakistani MNAs 2018–2023